Aminobacterium mobile is a Gram-negative, anaerobic, mesophilic, non-spore-forming and motile  bacterium from the genus of Aminobacterium which has been isolated from anaerobic lagoon from a dairy wastewater treatment plant in Colombia. Dissimilar to Aminobacterium colombiense,  Aminobacterium mobile has a marginally lower DNA GC-content (44 mol% vs 46 mol%.) Aminobacterium mobile is motile and ferments Serine to Acetate and Alanine. Aminobacterium mobile is both a Heterotroph and Asaccharolytic. Its adverse effects on both animals and humans are not yet known, but because of the ability of Aminobacterium mobile to degrade amino acids and peptides, the possibility of harmful effects cannot be excluded.

References

Bacteria described in 2000
Synergistota